Thomas Bennett Community College (TBCC) is a secondary school with academy status for pupils aged 11 to 19. It caters to approximately 1200 pupils in Years 7 to 14, including 160 in its sixth form.

Thomas Bennett Community College offers GCSEs and BTECs for pupils aged 11 to 16. Students in the sixth form have the option to study from a range of A-levels, further BTECs, CTECs and NVQ Diplomas.

History
The school was planned as part of the development of Crawley as a new town in the late 1940s. Originally it had been intended to open a grammar school and two secondary modern schools on the Tilgate campus, although by the time the school was built, this plan changed to provide a bilateral secondary school for boys and girls for a trial period of two years. This entitled the school to run separate grammar and secondary modern departments as part of one school.

The school was named after Sir Thomas Bennett, the chairman of Crawley Development Corporation.  This body had overseen the development of the New Town. Bennett officially opened the school in 1959 (the first pupils having joined the school in 1958). Although originally intended as a bilateral school, the staff of the school organised classes along comprehensive lines, with students working in sets depending on their ability in subjects, rather than broad streams. This idea proved so popular that the school became formally comprehensive by the end of the trial in 1960.

In 1974, local schools were reorganised in the area, and Thomas Bennett School became an Upper school for students aged 12 to 18, with former first year students remaining for an additional year in primary middle schools. This situation was then reversed in 2004, when reorganisation again returned the school to a full 11–18 secondary.

The school converted to academy status in September 2012.

Campus

The masterplan for Crawley New Town set aside the campus for the split-site school in the south-west corner of the neighbourhood of Tilgate between the A23 and Tilgate Forest. The campus contained both the Thomas Bennett school and the local primary school – Desmond Anderson School.

The original school comprised first two and then three main buildings at opposite ends of the campus. The adjoining Ashdown and Southgate buildings provided facilities, with a further building – known as the Canterbury building – approximately 1/4-mile to the south-east. Uses of the buildings varied. In the 1960s and 1970s, the Canterbury building was used for 'lower school' pupils in the first two years of school, with 'upper school' pupils in fourth and fifth forms moving to the Southgate building, and sixth formers based in the Ashdown building. By the 1990s, pupils in the main part of the school were split equally between Canterbury and Southgate buildings, depending on their house.

Both Thomas Bennett and Desmond Anderson schools were re-built, opening in entirely new buildings in 2005. The campus is now shared with the town's main leisure facilities: K2 Leisure Centre. The current building, designed by Nicholas Hare Architects, houses all pupils from all year groups in a building built under a Private Finance Initiative scheme which replaced several schools in the town in the period 2004–2005. A Commission for Architecture and the Built Environment audit reported that the building was well-designed.

Students
The school is entirely comprehensive, providing education for approximately 1200 pupils aged between 11 and 19 of all abilities. The school was formerly much larger with around 2000 pupils, but has reduced in recent years.

The school is organised into four houses, named after the original house masters/mistresses when the school opened in the 1950s, each of which was allocated a colour:
Hepburn (Yellow)
Parker (Green)
Roberts (Blue)
Wallis (Red)

Most pupils attending the school live within the catchment area, and transfer from one of the local primary schools:
Broadfield East Junior School
Desmond Anderson Primary School
Hilltop Primary School
Seymour Primary School
The Oaks Primary School

Notable former pupils
 Footballer Brian Bason
 Travel writer Simon Calder
 Politician Dawn Primarolo
 Porl Thompson of The Cure
 Technologist Alan E. Bell

External links
 Thomas Bennett Community College website

References

5.      https://amp.theguardian.com/world/2013/dec/06/patrick-daunt

Buildings and structures in Crawley
Secondary Schools in Crawley
Secondary schools in West Sussex
Academies in West Sussex
Educational institutions established in 1959
1959 establishments in England